Aloísio Moreira dos Santos, known as Iso Moreira, (21 June 1947 – 4 November 2022) was a Brazilian politician. A member of the Brazilian Social Democracy Party, he served in the Legislative Assembly of Goiás from 2001 to 2022.

Moreira died in Rio de Janeiro on 4 November 2022, at the age of 75.

References

1947 births
2022 deaths
Brazilian farmers
Members of the Legislative Assembly of Goiás
Brazilian Social Democracy Party politicians